Eupogonius arizonensis is a species of beetle in the family Cerambycidae. It was described by Knull in 1954. It is known from the United States.

References

Eupogonius
Beetles described in 1954